María Cotiello Pérez (born 21 November 1982) is a Spanish actress. She is also a visible campaigner for the officialization of the asturian language in Asturias.

Biography 
María Cotiello Pérez was born on 21 November 1982 either in Mieres or Gijón, depending on sources. She began to perform as an actress when she was 15 years old, moving to Madrid in 2001 to train at the Real Escuela Superior de Arte Dramático (RESAD). She starred in the feature film 13 Roses playing one of the 13 roses, Elena. She performed in multiple television series, including, SMS, sin miedo a soñar, Amar en tiempos revueltos, Ascensores, Hay alguien ahí, Los Protegidos, Centro médico, El ministerio del tiempo, Bajo sospecha, Bandolera, 14 de abril. La República, and stage plays such as La danza de la muerte, Dios de Woddy Allen and Presas.

Also graduated in Spanish Language (specialisation in Asturian), Cotiello is also a visible campaigner for the officialization of the asturian language in Asturias.

Filmography 

Film

Television

References 

1982 births
21st-century Spanish actresses
Spanish television actresses
Spanish film actresses
Spanish stage actresses
Actors from Asturias
Living people